The Anti-Corruption Agency of the Republic of Kazakhstan is a state anti-corruption body directly subordinate and accountable to the President of the Republic of Kazakhstan, which is responsible for the formation and implementation of anti- corruption policy of the Republic of Kazakhstan and coordination in the field of anti-corruption, as well as identification, suppression, disclosure and investigation of corruption offenses and other functions in accordance with the legislation of the Republic of Kazakhstan.

History 
August 6, 2014, according to the Decree of the President of the Republic of Kazakhstan No. 883 "On measures on further improvement of state administration system of Kazakhstan" was established the Agency of the Republic of Kazakhstan for civil service Affairs and anti-corruption. Instead of the liquidated Agency of the Republic of Kazakhstan for combating economic and corruption crime.

On December 11, 2015, the Ministry of public service Affairs of the Republic of Kazakhstan was established as an authorized body in the field of public service and anti-corruption with the transfer of functions and powers to manage the property and Affairs of the abolished Agency of the Republic of Kazakhstan for public service and anti-corruption. The Agency was renamed the National Anti-Corruption Bureau.

On September 13, 2016, the Ministry of civil service Affairs of the Republic of Kazakhstan was reorganized into the Agency of the Republic of Kazakhstan for civil service Affairs and anti-corruption. The national anti-corruption Bureau had the status of an Agency in the structure of the anti-corruption Agency.

Decree of the President of the Republic of Kazakhstan from June 13, 2019 No. 12 in order to further improve the system of state service and fighting corruption the National Bureau for anti-corruption (anti-corruption service) Agency of the Republic of Kazakhstan for civil service Affairs and anti-corruption transformed into the Agency of the Republic of Kazakhstan on combating corruption (anti-corruption service), as a state body directly subordinate and accountable to the President of the Republic of Kazakhstan.

The Agency is a law enforcement Agency that develops and implements the anti-corruption policy of the Republic of Kazakhstan and coordinates the fight against corruption, as well as identifying, suppressing, disclosing and investigating corruption offenses.

Ministerial awards 
In accordance with the decree of the President of the Republic of Kazakhstan from September 30, 2011 No. 155 "About the state symbols and heraldry departmental and others, equated to them, awards of some state bodies, directly subordinate and accountable to the President of the Republic of Kazakhstan, constitutional Council of the Republic of Kazakhstan, law enforcement agencies, courts, Armed Forces, other troops and military formations" departmental awards Agency for anti-corruption (anti-corruption services) are considered:

 Medals:
 "Minsiz kyzmet ushin" (for impeccable service) I, II, III degrees;
 For their contribution to Law Enforcement .
 Breastplate:
 "Uzdik kizmetker" (Excellent  officer) I, II degree;
 "Uzdik kyzmetshi" (Excellent employee) I, II degrees.

References 

Government of Kazakhstan
Anti-corruption agencies